John Sears may refer to:

John Sears (salt producer) (1744–1817), founder of salt industry in Cape Cod, Massachusetts
John Sears (political strategist) (1940–2020), American attorney and Republican political strategist
John Sears (racing driver) (1936–1999), NASCAR Grand National driver
John Edward Sears, British Member of Parliament for Cheltenham, 1906–1910
John George Sears (1870–1916), founder of Sears plc
John W. Sears (born 1930), former chairman of the Massachusetts Republican party and longtime activist
John Howell Sears (1823–1907), pioneer of the cities of Searsville and La Honda, California